Abdullah Mohammad Ali Abu Zema (born 4 April 1976) is a Jordanian professional football coach and former player.

Playing career
Abu Zema officially announced his retirement in playing football on 25 January 2005, at the age of 29, after sustaining an injury. An international friendly match was played between his country Jordan and Armenia on 1 August 2005 in Amman, sponsored by Prince Ali Bin Al-Hussein. After playing the first five minutes of the match, Abu Zema gave the captain armband to his teammate Haitham Al-Shboul as well as his 18 jersey shirt to his younger teammate Hassan Abdel-Fattah and left the field.

Managerial career

Assistant coach 
After retiring from playing football, Abu Zema became one of the assistant coaches of his national team (2006–09), under head coaches Mahmoud El-Gohary (2006–07), and Nelo Vingada (2007–09) until the Iraqi Adnan Hamad took over coaching the national team. When Dragan Talajić became head manager of Shabab Al-Ordon (2009–10), Abu Zema became his assistant coach ever since then. They both then moved to Abu Zema's home club Al-Wehdat (2010–11). When Ra'fat Ali, one of Abu Zema's companions, took proficiency in Kuwait, Abu Zema and Talajić joined him by coaching his team (2011–12).

Head coach 
Abu Zema had finally become a head coach himself when he began coaching Al-Wehdat in February 2013, succeeding the Egyptian Mohammad Omar.

On 11 January 2022, Abu Zema was announced had coach of Ansar. He left at the end of the 2021–22 season.

Career statistics

International

Managerial

Honours

Player 
Al-Wehdat 
 Jordan League: 1994–95, 1995–96, 1996–07, 1997, 2004–05
 Jordan FA Cup: 1996, 1997, 2000
 Jordan Super Cup: 1997, 1998, 2000, 2005
 Jordan Shield Cup: 1995, 2002, 2004

Al-Wakrah
 Qatar Stars League: 2000–01

Jordan
 Pan Arab Games: 1997, 1999

Manager 
Al-Wehdat 
 Jordanian Pro League: 2013–14, 2014–15, 2020
 Jordan FA Cup: 2013–14
 Jordan Super Cup: 2014, 2021
 Jordan Shield Cup: 2020

Kuwait SC
 Kuwait Super Cup: 2017

Ansar
 Lebanese FA Cup runner-up: 2021–22

References

External links
 
 

1976 births
Living people
Jordanian people of Palestinian descent
Jordanian footballers
Association football midfielders
Al-Wehdat SC players
Al-Wakrah SC players
Jordanian Pro League players
Qatar Stars League players
Jordan international footballers
2004 AFC Asian Cup players
Jordanian football managers
Al-Wehdat SC managers
Jordan national football team managers
Kuwait SC managers
Al Ansar FC managers
Jordanian Pro League managers
Kuwait Premier League managers
Lebanese Premier League managers
Jordanian expatriate footballers
Jordanian expatriate sportspeople in Qatar
Expatriate footballers in Qatar
Jordanian expatriate football managers
Jordanian expatriate sportspeople in Kuwait
Expatriate football managers in Kuwait
Expatriate football managers in Lebanon